TEC-5, or Tec 5, may refer to:

 Kharkiv TEC-5, a thermo-electric powerplant in the Kharkiv region of Ukraine
 Technician fifth grade or Tec 5, a rank of the United States Army in the 1940s